Following is a list of people from Ladera Heights, California, a census-designated place and unincorporated area in the southwestern part of Los Angeles County, California, United States.

 Arron Afflalo
 Chris Darden
 Randy Gardner
 Lisa Leslie
 Ken Norton
 Byron Scott
 Olympia Scott
 Chris Strait
 Tyler, The Creator
 Peter Vidmar

See also

 List of people from California
 List of people from Los Angeles (the city of Los Angeles; not the county of Los Angeles)

Ladera Heights
Ladera Heights
Ladera Heights